is a Japanese publishing company located in Shibuya, Tokyo, Japan.

AlphaPolis is a publisher of light novels and manga., particularly for online readers. The company is the publisher for several light novel series, including A Playthrough of a Certain Dude's VRMMO Life, New Saga, and Tsukimichi: Moonlit Fantasy.  They are most notable as the publisher of Gate, which has sold 6 million copies.  Gate received an anime adaptation that aired beginning on from July 4, 2015 until March 26, 2016.  Tsukimichi: Moonlit Fantasy also received an anime adaptation that aired beginning on July 7, 2021.

History 

AlphaPolis was launched as a publisher of online content in August, 2000.

In 2010, AlphaPolis acquired the rights to publish Gate, which began as a web novel on Arcadia.  The company then began publishing a manga adaptation in July 2011.  Several volumes (11, 12, 13, and 14) placed in the Oricon ranking for top 50 manga volume sales.

In 2013, AlphaPolis acquired the rights to publish Tsukimichi: Moonlit Fantasy, which began as a web novel on Shōsetsuka ni Narō.  The novel series went on to sell 2 million copies.  AlphaPolis began publishing a manga adaptation in 2015.  The book received an anime adaptation beginning in September 2021.

A Playthrough of a Dude's VRMMO Life is another series that began as a web novel on Shōsetsuka ni Narō, and was later turned into an AlphaPolis light novel publication in 2014, and manga adaptation also in 2014.  The manga placed several volumes (3, 5) on the Oricon bestseller list.  An anime adaptation was announced in February 2023.

The Technoroid anime received a manga adaptation via AlphaPolis beginning in January 2023

The company is listed on the Tokyo Stock Exchange and has been since October 2014.

AlphaPolis released the Alpha Manga app in August, 2021
 to read AlphaPolis manga on iPhone and Android phones.  Several of the AlphaManga titles were subsequently made available through Crunchyroll.

References 

Book publishing companies in Tokyo
Online publishing companies
Publishing companies established in 2000